Petar Ljubojević was an Austrian captain of the Varaždin Generalate (Slavonian Military Frontier) who led the Varaždin frontiersmen in revolt (1754–55). He was called "father and mother of the Varaždin frontier" (otac i majka varaždinske granice). The revolt was organized in the Orthodox church at Severin.

See also
Stefan Osmokruhović

References

18th-century Austrian people
18th-century Serbian people
Serbian rebels
Austrian military personnel
People of the Military Frontier
Habsburg Serbs